The list of ship decommissionings in 1870 includes a chronological list of all ships decommissioned in 1870.


References

See also 

1870
 Ship decommissionings